Jim Croce: A Nashville Tribute is a tribute album released by River North Records in 1997. The album consisted of contemporary country artists performing cover versions of songs by Jim Croce.

Mary Grady of Allmusic rated the album two stars out of five, saying that "If you like any of the particular artists on this collection, you may enjoy it on a case-by-case basis. If you are fan of Jim Croce, this contemporary country approach to his material may win you over, although it will undoubtedly lack the appeal of the music as delivered by its original author. If you are a fan of neither, this is not a disc you will want to own."

Track listing

Personnel
 Ira Antelis – background vocals
 Eddie Bayers – drums
 Barry Beckett – piano
 Crystal Bernard – vocals on "Photographs and Memories"
 Lane Brody – vocals on "I'll Have to Say I Love You in a Song"
 Kim Carnes – vocals on "Bad, Bad Leroy Brown"
 Mark Collie – vocals on "Rapid Roy (The Stock Car Boy)"
 Rodney Crowell – vocals on "Operator (That's Not the Way It Feels)"
 Charlie Daniels – dobro, fiddle, and vocals on "Box #10"
 Jerry Douglas – dobro
 Dan Dugmore – steel guitar
 Michael English – vocals on "Time in a Bottle"
 Larry Franklin – fiddle
 Tom Griffin – background vocals
 Tony Harrell – keyboards, piano
 Sammy Kershaw – vocals on "I Got a Name"
 Charlie Major – vocals on "You Don't Mess Around With Jim"
 Billy Panda – acoustic guitar, slide guitar
 Ronna Reeves – vocals on "New York's Not My Name"
 Michael Rhodes – bass guitar
 Chris Rodriguez – background vocals
 Brent Rowan – electric guitar
 Johnny Rutledge – background vocals
 Gino Speight – background vocals
 Keith Stegall – background vocals
 Larry Stewart – vocals on "One Less Set of Footsteps"

References

1997 compilation albums
Jim Croce tribute albums
Albums produced by Brent Rowan
River North Records albums